Catherine Douglas was a historical figure who tried to prevent the assassination of King James I of Scotland.

Catherine Douglas may also refer to:
Catherine Douglas, Baroness Glenbervie (1760–1817)
Catherine Douglas, Duchess of Queensberry (1701–1777), English socialite
Catherine Zeta-Jones (born 1969), wife of Michael Douglas
Kathy Douglas, American model
Katherine Douglas Smith (1878–?), militant British suffragette
Katherine Douglas (rower), 2020 British Olympian

See also
Kate Douglas (disambiguation)
Katie Douglas (disambiguation)